Yeragamballi  is a village in the southern state of Karnataka, India. It is located in the Yelandur taluk of Chamarajanagar district in Karnataka.

Demographics
 India census, Yeragamballi had a population of 5039 with 2660 males and 2379 females.

See also
 Chamarajanagar
 Districts of Karnataka

References

External links
 http://Chamarajanagar.nic.in/

Villages in Chamarajanagar district